Herbert William Compton Bennett (15 January 1900 – 11 August 1974), better known as Compton Bennett, was an English film director, writer and producer.  He is perhaps best known for directing the 1945 film The Seventh Veil and the 1950 version of the film King Solomon's Mines, an adaptation of an Allan Quatermain story.

Biography
Bennett was born in Tunbridge Wells, England.  At the beginning of his career, he worked as a band leader and a commercial artist before trying his hand at amateur filmmaking.  One of these early films helped him land a job at Alexander Korda's London Films in 1932.  There, he became a film editor; later he would help make instructional and propaganda films for the British armed forces during World War II.

Bennett's films tended to be sombre, but were very popular with the moviegoing public.  In 1946, Bennett accepted an invitation to go to Hollywood for Universal.

It was, however, during this time that he directed King Solomon's Mines. He was replaced during filming by Andrew Marton.

Bennett eventually returned to the UK.  From 1954 to 1957, he left film work to pursue interests in the theatre  and television, but produced four films in 1957, After the Ball, Man-Eater, That Woman Opposite and The Flying Scot.  Although he continued to write and direct for film and television, his subsequent productions were not as well received.

Bennett died in Sussex, England at the age of 74.

Filmography
The Fox Hunt (1936) (documentary)  – editor
Goofer Trouble (1940)(documentary)  – editor
Find, Fix and Strike (1942) (documentary)  – writer, director
 The Big Blockade (1942)  – editor
 The Flemish Farm (1943)  – editor
Men of Rochdale (1944) (documentary)  – director
 29 Acacia Avenue (1945) aka The Facts of Love  – editor, producer
 The Seventh Veil (1945)  – director
 The Years Between (1946)  – director
Daybreak (1948)  – director
 My Own True Love (1949)  – director
 That Forsyte Woman (1949) aka The Forsyte Saga  – director
King Solomon's Mines (1950)  – director
 So Little Time (1952)  – director
 The Gift Horse (1952) aka Glory at Sea  – director
 It Started in Paradise (1952)  – director
 Desperate Moment (1953)  – director
 Man-Eater (1957)  – director, producer
 That Woman Opposite (1957) aka City After Midnight  – writer, director
 After the Ball (1957)  – director
 The Flying Scot (1957) aka The Mailbag Robbery  – director, producer
White Hunter (1958) (TV series)  – director, producer (episodes edited together as feature Man-Eater)
The Four Just Men (1959) (TV series)  – director
 Beyond the Curtain (1960)  – director
The Adventures of Robin Hood (1960) (TV series)  – director
First Left Past Aden (1961) (documentary)  – director
How to Undress in Public Without Undue Embarrassment (1965)  – creator, director, producer
Brett (1971) (TV series)  – creator

References

External links 
BritMovie biography
New York Times reprint of Allmovie bio

English film directors
English film producers
English male screenwriters
Propaganda film directors
1900 births
1974 deaths
People from Royal Tunbridge Wells
20th-century English screenwriters
20th-century English male writers
20th-century English businesspeople